The UNO Federal Credit Union, or UNOFCU, was chartered in 1972 by the National Credit Union Administration
(NCUA) to serve the faculty, staff, and students of the University of New Orleans (UNO). Currently located in New Orleans, Louisiana, it has one branch located on the Lakefront main campus of UNO and serves approximately 5,000 members, with assets of over $25 Million USD. UNOFCU is also a member of the East Orleans Chapter of the Louisiana Credit Union League.

History
First housed in the Physical Plant Services building of the then Louisiana State University in New Orleans campus, UNOFCU opened as the financial institution to the UNO community. Over the last 35 years, it has moved 3 times: to the campus Administration building, the Math building, and finally to its current home in the Homer L. Hitt Alumni Center in 2003, allowing it to offer drive-up window service alongside its normal lobby service. UNOFCU has also grown to serve not only the students, faculty, and staff, but also contract workers, alumni, and student organizations. Having only one branch, the credit union relies on the CU Service Centers network to help its members who are spread around the country.
UNOFCU received a $299,000 NCUA no-interest loan through its Community Development Revolving Loan Fund after sustaining severe damage during Hurricane Katrina.

Membership
Eligibility for membership is instant upon becoming a student, alumni, employee, or contract worker of UNO and also extends to the immediate family members of current members. UNOFCU has a policy of "once a member, always a member." Employees remain eligible for membership even after their employment ends the university.

Current Officials
CEO - Christopher Maurer
President of the Board - Frank Schambach

UNOFCU's Board of Directors and Credit Committee, respectively made up of seven and five officials, are elected by and from the credit union's membership at the annual meetings held every March. The Board then appoints three supervisory committee officials.

References

http://www.unofcu.org, accessed July 2008
http://www.uno.edu, accessed July 2008
http://www.alumni.uno.edu, accessed July 2008

External links
Official UNOFCU Website
University of New Orleans

Credit unions based in Louisiana
University of New Orleans
Banks established in 1972